Maurice Jacquel (14 March 1929 – 10 April 2004) was a French wrestler. He competed in two events at the 1960 Summer Olympics.

References

1929 births
2004 deaths
French male sport wrestlers
Olympic wrestlers of France
Wrestlers at the 1960 Summer Olympics
Sportspeople from Vosges (department)